Hokey Wolf is a Hanna-Barbera cartoon about the adventures of a con-artist wolf who is always trying to cheat his way into the simple life. He is often accompanied alongside by his young, diminutive, sidekick son Ding-A-Ling Wolf, both of whom are featured as part of The Huckleberry Hound Show in their own segment.

History
The initial creation of Hokey Wolf occurred when another follow-up segment was needed, because Yogi Bear's rising popularity in preceding appearances warranted a promotion to his own self-titled show. As a result of the change in schedule, Hokey Wolf had made its debut midway through the third season of The Huckleberry Hound Show and became a regular appearance afterward on this segment. Hokey's theme music for his segment of the show was composed by Hoyt Curtin and used an instrumental version of the refrain from "Hail, Hail, the Gang's All Here".

The segment follows the everyday misadventures of its protagonist, Hokey Wolf, and his young companion and son, Ding-A-Ling Wolf, through their typical con-artist routines of getting what they need in their daily lives. Through each episode, Hokey would usually try to fool different characters with food-stealing schemes and/or finding a place to stay without cost, only for most of these tricks to backfire on him in one way or another.

Character information
Both of the cartoon's feature characters were designed by animation artist and character designer Ed Benedict.

Hokey Wolf
Hokey Wolf (voiced by Daws Butler impersonating Phil Silvers) is the smooth-talking title character throughout each cartoon. His main hobby in life was to outsmart and coax the clueless out of free meals or places to stay, much of which he seemed to do so with ease, despite possible consequences later on. Hokey typically wears his trademark green bow tie with white collar and a violet-colored hat. His personality would later be recycled for fellow Hanna-Barbera characters such as Top Cat, who starred in a prime-time sitcom that ran from 1961 to 1962 that followed a very similar concept.

Ding-A-Ling Wolf

Ding-A-Ling Wolf (voiced by Doug Young impersonating Buddy Hackett) is the young sidekick and son of Hokey Wolf who always accompanies him throughout each misadventure. He is usually eager to follow in his dad’s ambitious con-artist footsteps, but often reconsiders the plans he will come up with in many situations. Ding typically wears a bowler hat (sometimes red, sometimes black), a sleeveless green shirt, and a black vest.

Original segment on The Huckleberry Hound Show

In total, Hokey and Ding-A-Ling Wolf starred in 28 seven-minute cartoons throughout the third and fourth seasons (1960–1961) of The Huckleberry Hound Show. Their pilot episode was Tricks and Treats. Below is a complete listing of all cartoon shorts with the protagonist Hokey Wolf:

1960 season

1961 season

Home media
The episodes Tricks and Treats and Castle Hassle are on the DVD Hanna-Barbera 25 Cartoon Collection, part of The Best of Warner Bros. collection series.

Further appearances

Hanna-Barbera series
While the initial series ended in December 1961, Hokey Wolf went on to appear in four other animated Hanna-Barbera series alongside other classic characters. These were as follows:

 Yogi's Gang (1973) – Hokey was a member of the crew.
 Laff-A-Lympics (1977–1978) – Hokey Wolf played as a team member of The Yogi Yahooeys.
 Yogi's Treasure Hunt (1985–1988) – Hokey was a regular guest star in several episodes.
 Yo Yogi! (1991) – Hokey Wolf (voiced by Matt Hurwitz) co-starred as the mayor of Jellystone Town. His younger companion Ding-A-Ling also made a brief non-speaking cameo as Hokey's photographer in the episode "Super Duper Snag", but he has a speaking role in the episode "Polly Want a Safe Cracker" voiced by Patric Zimmerman.

Hanna-Barbera films
 In the last episode of The Yogi Bear Show (1962), Hokey Wolf, along with his sidekick Ding-A-Ling, were among the guests who showed up to wish their friend Yogi Bear a happy birthday.
 In the 1972 television movie Yogi's Ark Lark, both Hokey Wolf and Ding-A-Ling appeared together as part of the gang. The film was part of The ABC Saturday Superstar Movie and also the pilot for Yogi's Gang.
 In the 1982 television special Yogi Bear's All Star Comedy Christmas Caper, Hokey Wolf co-starred as a member of the group that visited Yogi in Jellystone Park. Hokey Wolf also mentioned to Ranger Smith that he is friends with the United States Secretary of the Interior.
 In the 1988 feature-length television film The Good, the Bad, and Huckleberry Hound, Hokey Wolf co-starred in and played the mayor of a western town named Two-Bit.

Other appearances
 Both Hokey and Ding-A-Ling appeared on Harvey Birdman, Attorney at Law.
 Hokey made non-speaking cameo appearances in the episodes "Peanut Puberty", "Evolutionary War", "Juror in Court", and "The Death of Harvey".
 Ding-A-Ling (voiced by Neil Ross) was a plaintiff in "SPF" when his name was being used without his consent as a URL for a pornographic website. He also appeared in "The Death of Harvey", and made cameo appearances in "Identity Theft" and "Juror in Court".
 Hokey Wolf and Ding-A-Ling both appear in the HBO Max original series Jellystone!. Ding-A-Ling is portrayed as a child in the series.

Hokey Wolf in other languages
 Brazilian Portuguese: Joca & Dingue-Lingue
 
 
 
 
 
 
 
 
 
 
 
 
  のオオカミ (Hokey Ookami)

See also

 The Huckleberry Hound Show
 List of The Huckleberry Hound Show episodes
 List of works produced by Hanna-Barbera
 List of Hanna-Barbera characters

References

External links

 Hokey Wolf at Don Markstein's Toonopedia. Archived from the original on February 5, 2016.

American children's animated comedy television series
Yogi Bear characters
Huckleberry Hound television series
Fictional con artists
Fictional anthropomorphic characters
Fictional tricksters
Fictional pranksters
Hanna-Barbera characters
First-run syndicated television programs in the United States
Television series by Hanna-Barbera
Television series about wolves
1960s American animated television series
1960 American television series debuts
1961 American television series endings
Male characters in animation